Agim Dajçi (born 27 July 2000) is an Albanian footballer who plays as a defender for KF Besa Kavajë on loan from Kategoria Superiore club Partizani Tirana.

Career

Partizani Tirana
A graduate of the club's youth academy, Dajçi made his competitive debut for the club on 18 September 2019, playing the entirety of a 3-0 Cup victory over Vora. He made his first appearance in the Albanian Superliga later that season, starting in a 3–0 home victory over Vllaznia on July 24.

Career statistics

Club

References

External links

2000 births
Living people
Shkëndija Tiranë players
FK Partizani Tirana players
KF Bylis players
KF Besa Kavajë players
Kategoria Superiore players
Albanian footballers
Association football defenders